Mark Irwin is an American country music songwriter.

In 1990, he co-wrote Alan Jackson's "Here in the Real World", which was twice nominated for Song of the Year by the Country Music Association. He also wrote "Till I Was Loved by You" by Chely Wright, "If the Jukebox Took Teardrops" by Danni Leigh, and "19 and Crazy" by Bomshel. In 2013, he wrote Tim McGraw and Taylor Swift's "Highway Don't Care", which reached number 1, and Tyler Farr's "Redneck Crazy".

References

American country songwriters
American male songwriters
Living people
People from the Bronx
Songwriters from New York (state)
Year of birth missing (living people)